Dalila Meftahi is a Tunisian actress.

Filmography

Cinema

Feature films 
 1997 : Redeyef 54 by Ali Labidi
 1997 : Vivre au paradis by Bourlem Guerdjou 
 2002 : Khorma by Jilani Saadi
 2008 : The Wedding Song  by Karin Albou
 2010 : End December by Moez Kamoun
 2010 : Les Palmiers blessés by Abdellatif Ben Ammar
 2011 : Black Gold by Jean-Jacques Annaud
 2021 : L'Albatros by Fredj Trabelsi

Short films 
 2000 : En face by Mehdi Ben Attia and Zina Modiano
 2010 : Tabou by Meriem Riveill
 2011 : Le Fond du puits by Moez Ben Hassen

Television

Series 
 1992  :
 El Douar by Abdelkader Jerbi : Monia
 Liyam Kif Errih by Slaheddine Essid : Latifa
 1993 : El Assifa by Abdelkader Jerbi
 1995 : El Hassad by Abdelkader Jerbi
 1997 : El Khottab Al Bab season 2) by Slaheddine Essid
 1999 : Anbar Ellil by Habib Mselmani : Hallouma
 2000 :
 Ya Zahra Fi Khayali by Abdelkader Jerbi
 Mnamet Aroussia by Slaheddine Essid : Radhia
 2001 : Ryhana by Hamadi Arafa
 2003 : Ikhwa wa Zaman by Hamadi Arafa
 2004 :
 Jari Ya Hammouda by Abdeljabar Bhouri
 Hissabat w Aqabat by Habib Mselmani
 2005 : Mal Wa Amal by Abdelkader Jerbi
 2006 :
 Le Kiosque by Belgacem Briki and Moncef El Kateb
 Hayet Wa Amani by Mohamed Ghodhbane
 Nwassi w Ateb by Abdelkader Jerbi
 2007 : Kamanjet Sallema by Hamadi Arafa : Donia
 2008 :
 Bin Ethneya by Habib Mselmani
 Sayd Errim by Ali Mansour : Mongiya
 2009 : Maktoub (season 2) by Sami Fehri : Ibtissem mother
 2010 :
 Garage Lekrik by Ridha Béhi
 Donia by Naïm Ben Rhouma
 2011 - 2013 : Njoum Ellil (season 3-4) by Mehdi Nasra
 2012 : Pour les beaux yeux de Catherine by Hamadi Arafa : Afifa
 2013 : Layem by Khaled Barsaoui
 2014 - 2015 : Naouret El Hawa by Madih Belaïd : Mongia
 2015 : Dar Elozzab by Lassaad Oueslati
 2016 :
 Warda w Kteb by Ahmed Rjeb
 Dima Ashab by Abdelkader Jerbi : Souad
 2016 - 2017 : Flashback by Mourad Ben Cheikh
 2017 :
 Dawama by Naim Ben Rhouma
 Awled Moufida (season 3) by Sami Fehri 
 2018 : Ali Chouerreb by Madih Belaïd and Rabii Tekali : Fatma
 2019 : Machair by Muhammet Gök
 2020 :
 Galb El Dhib by Bassem Hamraoui : Akri
 Des Juges de notre histoire by Anouar Ayachi : the mother of the prince from the era of Judge Ibn Abi Mehrez
 2021 :
 Millionnaire by Muhammet Gök : Karima
 Ibn khaldoun by Sami Faour : Assia's mother

TV movies 
 1987 :  by Franco Rossi
 1993 : Des héros ordinaires (episode Identity check) by Peter Kassovitz 
 2005 : Le Voyage de Louisa by Patrick Volson

Emissions 
 2013 : Taxi (episode 1) on Ettounsiya TV

Theater 
 2003 : Ennar Tkhallef Erremad, staging by Dalila Meftahi
 2005 : Antria courage, staging by Dalila Meftahi
 2004 : Dar Hajer, staging de by Dalila Meftahi
 2007 : Harr adhalam text by Samir Ayadi and staging by Mounira Zakraoui 
 2010 : Attamarine, staging by Dalila Meftahi

Decorations 
  Officer of the Order of the Republic (Tunisia, 13 August 2020)

References

External links

Tunisian film actresses
People from Tunis
Living people
20th-century Tunisian actresses
1960 births